Kosmos 1785 ( meaning Cosmos 1785) is a Soviet US-K missile early warning satellite which was launched in 1986 as part of the Soviet military's Oko programme. The satellite is designed to identify missile launches using optical telescopes and infrared sensors.

Kosmos 1785 was launched from Site 41/1 at Plesetsk Cosmodrome in the Russian SSR. A Molniya-M carrier rocket with a 2BL upper stage was used to perform the launch, which took place at 09:29 UTC on 15 October 1986. The launch successfully placed the satellite into a molniya orbit. It subsequently received its Kosmos designation, and the international designator 1986-078A. The United States Space Command assigned it the Satellite Catalog Number 17031.

It re-entered the Earth's atmosphere on 28 February 2002.

See also

List of Kosmos satellites (1751–2000)
List of R-7 launches (1985–1989)
1986 in spaceflight
List of Oko satellites

References

Kosmos satellites
Spacecraft launched in 1986
Oko
Spacecraft launched by Molniya-M rockets
Spacecraft which reentered in 2002